Wembley Stadium in London is the current exclusive home stadium for the England national football team. This has been the case since it was opened in 2007, following on from the old Wembley Stadium it replaced. England have however also played many of their home games away from Wembley throughout their history, both in friendly matches and for competitive tournaments.

History

Pre-1923: Before Wembley

The England team played their first official home match on 8 March 1873 (their second official international). During this period, England used various grounds around the country, including many cricket grounds, as their home venue. Surrey County Cricket Club's ground The Oval in south London was the first and most used venue of this time, following on from its use for the England v Scotland representative matches played between 1870 and 1872.

1924–1999: Old Wembley

England played its first game at Wembley's Empire Stadium the following year in 1924, although Wembley was then only used for games against Scotland until May 1951, when England played Argentina. Wembley was then used increasingly for the next half-century, meaning just 10 home games were played outside of the Empire Stadium in the period after 1951 until 1999.

2001–2007: On tour
The next series of non-Wembley home games, 34 in all, took place between 2001 and 2007, in the period between the closing of the Empire Stadium and the opening of the new Wembley Stadium, due to it being built on the same site. When the Empire Stadium closed in October 2000, the national team went "on tour". The stadium was not demolished until 2003, and the new stadium was not completed until 2007, well behind schedule. Manchester United's home stadium Old Trafford was the most used ground during the tour period.

The tour programme saw the England team return to several cities, for the first time in over 50 years. While the tour was considered a success, the cost of the stadium meant The Football Association had no plans to stage home games away from Wembley after 2007.

2007–present: New Wembley

The first England game at the new Wembley Stadium was on 1 June 2007, against Brazil.

In the build-up to Euro 2016, England played two games away from Wembley for the first time since Wembley's opening. They played against Turkey at Etihad Stadium, Manchester and against Australia at Stadium of Light, Sunderland.

Non-Wembley home matches

Not included is the Northern Ireland game in 1973 at Goodison Park as Northern Ireland were the intended home team; the match was moved from Belfast to Liverpool due to ongoing civil unrest.

References

External links

Home stadium
Eng